Bryan Fletcher (born June 27, 1986, in Steamboat Springs, Colorado, Colorado) is an American former Nordic combined skier who has competed between 2002 and 2018.

At the FIS Nordic World Ski Championships 2011 in Oslo, Fletcher finished 22nd in the 10 km individual normal hill and 40th in the individual large hill. His best finish at the World Championships is a fifth position, in 2015, in Falun, in the 10 km individual large hill.

He won a stage in the World Cup, in March 2012, in Oslo.

His brother is also a skier, Taylor Fletcher.

References 
 Fletcher's personal website

 Interview with Taylor and Bryan Fletcher 2015/03 at Nordicjumpworld.com (german and english)

1986 births
Living people
American male Nordic combined skiers
Sportspeople from Colorado
People from Steamboat Springs, Colorado
Nordic combined skiers at the 2014 Winter Olympics
Nordic combined skiers at the 2018 Winter Olympics
Olympic Nordic combined skiers of the United States